Freedom Force is the name of two fictional teams appearing in American comic books published by Marvel Comics.

Publication history
The original version first appeared in Uncanny X-Men #199 (November 1985) and was created by Chris Claremont and John Romita Jr. Freedom Force was a supervillain team, though they occasionally acted in a heroic capacity as well. It was a government-sponsored team composed mainly of Mystique's version of Brotherhood of Evil Mutants. They mostly interacted with the X-Men, X-Factor, and New Mutants, but also repeatedly met the Avengers.

The second team first appeared in Avengers: The Initiative #12 (June 2007) and were created by Dan Slott, Christos N. Gage, and Steve Uy. It was set up as Montana's Fifty State Initiative superteam.

Fictional team biography

Mystique's Freedom Force

When mutant and human relationships worsen, the Brotherhood of Evil Mutants's leader Mystique decides that it has become too dangerous for them to continue their current path. She offers the group's services to Valerie Cooper, a United States National Security Advisor, in exchange for full pardons. Cooper sees a great opportunity in Mystique's offer, but wants the team to prove their loyalty first by arresting the original group's founder Magneto. The team accepts, and is renamed "Freedom Force" with the sorceress Spiral added to the team. They attack Magneto at a remembrance ceremony for the Holocaust. Though they meet a decisive defeat at the hands of Magneto's new allies, the X-Men, Magneto decides to surrender himself to Freedom Force.

On their next mission, Spider-Woman is added to the team's line-up. When the Avengers are framed by their embittered former member Quicksilver, the U.S. government sends Freedom Force to arrest the Avengers, which they do successfully. Spider-Woman feels guilty for these actions, frees the Avengers from jail, and leaves Freedom Force, becoming a fugitive. Another three members are added: Crimson Commando, Stonewall and Super Sabre, all World War II veterans who decided to take justice in their own hands and hunt down and execute criminals. When they targeted Storm, they were defeated and turned themselves in. It was thought that the former heroes could be redeemed and they were offered a position on Freedom Force.

Over the next few months, they are given many unpopular tasks, such as enforcing the Mutant Registration Act, arresting the outlaw X-Men, and saving the people of Dallas from an attack by an evil god. Freedom Force clashes with X-Factor and the New Mutants when they learn that Freedom Force is helping the U.S. government forcibly recruit young mutants and potential mutants for training and eventual government service. During this time, Spiral leaves the team for her own reasons. Freedom Force also helps train Captain America and assists in apprehending the mutant terrorists Resistants.

Freedom Force also participates in other missions of a more general nature, including the rescue of Senator Robert Kelly from a South American drug syndicate that had kidnapped during a diplomatic visit, as well as helping to contain a jailbreak at Truman Marsh's Vault.

The team begin to fall apart after the mutant Forge asks them to protect Muir Island against the Reavers. During this mission, Stonewall and Destiny are killed, and Avalanche is severely injured. The death of Destiny especially hits Mystique hard and the team fights the Avengers without her leadership. Shortly after the battle at Muir Island, Cooper is possessed by the Shadow King and ordered to kill Mystique, however, Cooper resists the Shadow King's influence and seriously injures herself rather than commit murder.  Mystique then assumes Val's identity, passing Cooper's injured body as her own corpse, and later aids the X-Men and X-Factor as a "mole" among the Shadow King's servants.

Without Mystique, the remaining Freedom Force members are sent on a disastrous mission in Kuwait during the first Gulf War, in which Super Sabre is killed and Crimson Commando severely injured. To save Crimson Commando's life, Avalanche leaves Pyro and Blob stranded in enemy territory. Avalanche and Crimson Commando, now a cyborg, continue to work for the US government, apparently as covert operations agents. The team is soon replaced by the government team X-Factor, also under Val Cooper's supervision.

Initiative Freedom Force

After the superhuman "Civil War", registered superheroes were teamed up and assigned to a state. Montana's Fifty State Initiative team is Freedom Force.

This Freedom Force team consists of Cloud 9, Think Tank, Equinox and Spinner, led by the Golden Age hero Challenger.

During the Secret Invasion storyline, Equinox was revealed to be a Skrull infiltrator who is killed by Cloud 9. Spinner dies soon after while trying to destroy a Skrull weapon system.

During the Dark Reign storyline, new Initiative leader Norman Osborn orders Freedom Force to attack the Heavy Hitters after they secede from the Initiative. He feels he can trust the team to follow orders due both to Equinox's criminal past and to Challenger coming from a time where authority is to be respected and obeyed without question. They help the other Initiative teams to defeat and capture the Heavy Hitters' leader, Prodigy.

During the Siege of Asgard, Steve Rogers reports that Challenger refused to take part in the attack on Asgard. Norman Osborn excludes his team and Stark-formed teams from the Siege.

During the Fear Itself storyline, members of Freedom Force appear at a meeting held by Prodigy regarding magical hammers that have crashed into the Earth. Between these, there is also an inexplicably alive Spinner.

Members

Mystique's Freedom Force members
 Mystique - Leader.
 Avalanche
 Blob
 Valerie Cooper - Freedom Force's government liaison.
 Crimson Commando
 Destiny
 Pyro
 Spider-Woman 
 Spiral
 Stonewall
 Super Sabre

Initiative Freedom Force members
 Challenger - Leader.
 Cloud 9 - A superhero who can manipulate a cloud-like gas form.
 Equinox - Was revealed to be a Skrull infiltrator who had Equinox's powers. Killed by Cloud 9.
 Spinner - A superheroine whose powers rotate every 24 hours. Some of her known powers have included invulnerability, super-strength, super-speed, and flight. 
 Think Tank - A superhero with telekinesis. His brain is in a liquid-filled globe that is in place of his head.

Freedom Force trademark
Marvel Comics abandoned the Freedom Force trademark in the 1990s and it was eventually re-registered by computer game developer Irrational Games, which used it as the name for their own team of comic book heroes (with no connection to Marvel or its characters). These all-new characters were featured in two games and one comic book miniseries (through Image Comics).

Alternate versions
An undead version of Freedom Force appears in the Marvel Zombies universe consisting of Mystique, Pyro, and Avalanche. They are seen in pursuit of the still-living Blob, whom they apprehend and convert into a zombie like themselves. United as a foursome, they then attack the X-Men who defeat and destroy them all.

In other media
Freedom Force is alluded in X-Men: Evolution. In the series finale, Professor Charles Xavier caught glimpses of future actions via Apocalypse; one action being the former Brotherhood of Mutants group (Avalanche, Toad, Blob, Quicksilver and Scarlet Witch) as well as Pyro standing in front of a S.H.I.E.L.D. sign, foreshadowing Freedom Force.

References

External links
 Freedom Force I at Marvel Wiki
 Freedom Force II at Marvel Wiki
 Freedom Force I at Comic Vine
 Freedom Force II at Comic Vine
 America's Heroes: Freedom Force
 

Marvel Comics mutants
Marvel Comics superhero teams
X-Men supporting characters